Basha may refer to:

Baasha (king), a Hebrew king
Basha (film), a Tamil movie
Basha (tarpaulin), British military slang for a shelter or sleeping area
 Arabic pronunciation of the Turkish title "Pasha", formerly used by some Arab rulers in Ottoman-influenced areas
 Basha (title), an Ethiopian rank originally derived from the Turkish "Pasha" but of lower status
Basha, a chain of Lebanese cuisine restaurants in the Greater Montreal area

People with the surname
 Amal Basha, Yemeni women's rights activist
 Arbër Basha (born 1998), Albanian footballer
 Hassan Abu Basha, Egyptian military officer and politician
 Migjen Basha (born 1987), Albanian footballer
Lulzim Basha (born 1974), Albanian politician

See also
 Bashar (disambiguation)

Albanian-language surnames